Ingrain (or wood-chip) wallpaper is a decorating material. It consists of two layers of paper with wood fibre in between; different kinds of ingrain wallpaper are distinguished by the size and form of the fibre pieces.

Ingrain wallpaper was invented by German pharmacist Hugo Erfurt in 1864; marketed by the company his grandfather founded, it was first used as a decoration for shop windows, but began seeing use as a wallpaper from the 1920s on as well.

Ingrain wallpaper is the most commonly used type of wallpaper in Germany. It was also commonplace in the United Kingdom from the 1960s onwards.

It can also be very difficult to remove, especially when several coats of paint have been applied.

References 

Paper products
Wallcoverings
German inventions
1864 introductions
1864 in Germany